The members of the 34th General Assembly of Newfoundland were elected in the Newfoundland general election held in September 1966. The general assembly sat from November 30, 1966 to October 4, 1971.

The Liberal Party led by Joey Smallwood formed the government.

George W. Clarke served as speaker.

There were five sessions of the 34th General Assembly:

Fabian O'Dea served as lieutenant governor of Newfoundland until 1969. Ewart John Arlington Harnum succeeded O'Dea as lieutenant-governor.

Members of the Assembly 
The following members were elected to the assembly in 1966:

Notes:

By-elections 
By-elections were held to replace members for various reasons:

Notes:

References 

Terms of the General Assembly of Newfoundland and Labrador